A syrette is a device for injecting liquid through a needle. It is similar to a syringe except that it has a closed flexible tube (like that typically used for toothpaste) instead of a rigid tube and piston. It was developed by the pharmaceutical manufacturer Squibb, eventually merged into the current day Bristol-Myers Squibb.

The morphine syrette used in World War II had a wire loop pin with a guard in the end of the hollow needle that was used to break a seal where the needle was attached to the tube. It was similar to a Superglue tube. After breaking the seal, the wire loop pin was removed and the hollow needle was inserted under the skin at a shallow angle and the tube flattened between the thumb and fingers (see subcutaneous injection). After injection the used tube was pinned to the receiving soldier's collar to inform others of the dose administered.

The American armed forces also distributed atropine in syrettes. Chemical treatment was subsequently distributed in autoinjector form.

See also 
Uniject

External links 

 Museum of Drugs Morphine

Medical equipment
Drug delivery devices